Nikola Minkov (born 4 May 1987) is a former Bulgarian footballer who played as a midfielder, and now works in marketing and SEO optimization.

Football career
Minkov spent his childhood in the professional association football club Septemvri Sofia. In 2006 he was transferred to Svilengrad 1921 and after that he wore the team colors of Montana, Septemvri, Minyor Bobov Dol, Kaliakra Kavarna, Akademik Sofia. He ended his football career at the age of 25 in 2012.

Career statistics

Education
Nikola Minkov graduated from the University of National and World Economy:

Digital Marketing Career
 Founder of SEO Аgency Serpact in 2014.

References

External links
Official blog

Living people
1987 births
Bulgarian footballers
FC Montana players
FC Septemvri Sofia players
PFC Kaliakra Kavarna players
Akademik Sofia players
First Professional Football League (Bulgaria) players
Association football midfielders